Miloslav Mečíř was the defending champion of the singles event at the ABN World Tennis Tournament but lost in the first round. Third-seeded Joakim Nyström won the singles title after a 6–1, 6–2 win in the final against fourth-seeded Anders Järryd.

Seeds

Draw

Finals

Upper half

Lower half

References

External links
 ITF tournament edition details

1986 ABN World Tennis Tournament